Chaminé is a village in the southeastern part of the island of Santiago, Cape Verde in the Atlantic Ocean. In 2010 its population was 79. It is located 2 km east of São Domingos. It is part of the municipality of São Domingos. Singer Codé di Dona was native to Chaminé.

References

Villages and settlements in Santiago, Cape Verde
São Domingos Municipality, Cape Verde